Microbacterium enclense is a Gram-positive, non-spore-forming and non-motile bacterium from the genus Microbacterium which has been isolated from marine sediments from the Chorao Island in India.

References

External links
Type strain of Microbacterium enclense at BacDive -  the Bacterial Diversity Metadatabase	

enclense
Bacteria described in 2015